Martina Elhenická (born 10 October 1993) is a Czech swimmer. She competed in the women's 1500 metre freestyle event at the 2017 World Aquatics Championships.

References

1993 births
Living people
Czech female swimmers
Place of birth missing (living people)
Swimmers at the 2010 Summer Youth Olympics
Czech female freestyle swimmers